Beauty and the Beat is a live collaboration between Tarja Turunen and Mike Terrana.

The track listing consists of a mix of classical pieces, covers of both Queen and Led Zeppelin, songs by Tarja's previous band Nightwish, and her own songs.

On 23 April 2014, earMUSIC released a teaser trailer and the official trailer came out on 9 May.

Background
The idea was conceived by Turunen, who had worked with Terrana on several projects in the past, including her first live recording, Act I: Live in Rosario. On her website, she states: "Our main goal with these kinds of concerts is that younger audiences experience the beauty and power of a symphonic orchestra and choir." Terrana's explanatory comment was, "It's obvious that I provide the BEAT and Tarja provides the BEAUTY."

Double CD track listing

Double DVD track listing

+Bonus
 Bonus Material
 Photo Gallery

References

External links
 Beauty and the Beat website
 Tarja official Facebook page
 Tarja Turunen official website
 Beauty and the Beat official trailer

2014 albums
Tarja Turunen albums